Leucosyrinx nicoya is an extinct species of sea snail, a marine gastropod mollusk in the family Pseudomelatomidae, the turrids and allies.

Distribution
Fossils of this marine species were found in Pliocene strata of the Charco Azul Formation of Costa Rica; age range: 5.332 to 2.588 Ma.

References

 Olsson, Axel Adolf. "Tertiary and Quaternary fossils from the Burica Peninsula of Panama and Costa Rica." (1942): 153–258.
 W. P. Woodring. 1970. Geology and paleontology of canal zone and adjoining parts of Panama: Description of Tertiary mollusks (gastropods: Eulimidae, Marginellidae to Helminthoglyptidae). United States Geological Survey Professional Paper 306(D):299-452

nicoya
Gastropods described in 1942